"Music for Chameleons" is a 1982 single by Gary Numan from his album, I, Assassin. The song peaked at number 19 on the UK Singles Chart. The song was composed during Numan's round-the-world trip in a light aircraft, which he undertook together with another pilot. Numan states in his autobiography that he kept singing it to himself so much that it got on the nerves of his co-pilot. The song is highly unusual in using fretless bass as the main melody instrument.

Track listing
Taken from UK releases.
 7" single (Beg.70)
 Music for Chameleons - 3:40
 Noise Noise - 3:44

 12" single (Beg.70(T))
 Music for Chameleons (Extended Version)
 Noise Noise
 Bridge? What Bridge

There are at least three released mixes; the 7-inch edit (3:35) (also available on The Best of Gary Numan 1978–1983), the 12-inch "Extended Version" (6:57) (available on Exposure) and the album mix running at 6:06.

Personnel 
Taken from 7" UK release.
Music for Chameleons
 Gary Numan - vocals, keyboards
 Pino Palladino - bass
 Chris Slade - drums

Noise Noise
 Gary Numan - vocals, instruments
 Thereza Bazar - vocals
 David Van Day - helpful hints

Charts

In popular culture 
The song features in the episode I Know What Alan Did Last Summer of season two of the comedy series I'm Alan Partridge. Alan Partridge mimes along to the song on air-bass-guitar. A snippet from the scene also serves as the backdrop to the title menu of the season two DVD.

References

1982 songs
Gary Numan songs
Beggars Banquet Records singles
1982 singles
Songs written by Gary Numan